Frank Faulkner may refer to:

Frank Faulkner, pseudonym of Edward S. Ellis (1840–1916), American author
Frank Faulkner, Perry Mason character played by Robert Bice
Frankie Faulkner, character in Alias Nick Beal

See also
Frank Falconer (1883–1970), politician from Alberta, Canada
Frank Falkner (1918–2003), British-born American biologist and pediatrician
Francis Faulkner (disambiguation)